The Assut de l'Or Bridge (Valencian: Pont de l'Assut de l'Or, Spanish: Puente de la Presa del Oro) is a white single-pylon cable-stayed bridge in the City of Arts and Sciences in Valencia, Spain, designed by Valencian architect and civil engineer Santiago Calatrava and completed in December 2008. The name l'Assut de l'Or is Valencian for the Dam of the Gold and refers to a dam that was located nearby, although locally it is referred to as El Jamonero (The Ham Holder) or Pont de l'Arpa, Spanish: Puente del Arpa (The Harp Bridge). Calatrava called it the Serreria Bridge.

Design
The bridge crosses the Turia Gardens in southeast Valencia, Spain near the east end of the City of Arts and Sciences complex. Its design is a variant of Santiago Calatrava's 1992 design of a cantilever spar cable-stayed bridge in Seville, Spain. In the Serreria bridge, the pylon is curved backward and back-stayed to concrete counterweights in the roadway.  The aesthetic effect of the Serreria bridge arises in part from the curved pylon and the 29 parallel cables supporting the bridge deck, accented at night by spot lighting of the cables and the pylon.  The bridge deck has two carriageways, three lanes each for cars and one additional lane for a tramway, and a carriageway for only pedestrian and cycle traffic along the middle spine of the deck by the cable stays.

Gallery

See also
Samuel Beckett Bridge in Dublin, Ireland, in which the forward curved pylon is also back stayed 
The Erasmusbrug in the Netherlands, another single pylon cable-stayed bridge in which the pylon is back stayed

References

External links

 L´Assut de l´Or Bridge (Serreria Bridge), Valencia, Spain (2009), Luis Viñuela y José Martínez Salcedo

Bridges in the Valencian Community
Bridges completed in 2008
Bridges by Santiago Calatrava
Buildings and structures in Valencia
Transport in the Valencian Community
Tourist attractions in Valencia
Cable-stayed bridges in Spain